The 1888 Rhode Island gubernatorial election was held on April 4, 1888. Republican nominee Royal C. Taft defeated Democratic incumbent John W. Davis with 52.33% of the vote.

General election

Candidates
Major party candidates
Royal C. Taft, Republican
John W. Davis, Democratic

Other candidates
George W. Gould, Prohibition

Results

References

1888
Rhode Island
Gubernatorial